The Curacao myotis (Myotis nesopolus) is a species of vesper bat (family Vespertilionidae).
It is found in Bonaire (Netherlands), Colombia, Curaçao and Venezuela.

Sources

Mouse-eared bats
Mammals of Colombia
Taxonomy articles created by Polbot
Bats of South America
Taxa named by Gerrit Smith Miller Jr.
Mammals described in 1900